The phaneron (Greek φανερός [phaneros] "visible, manifest") is the subject matter of phenomenology, or of what Charles Sanders Peirce later called phaneroscopy. The term, which was introduced in 1905, is similar to the concept of the "phenomenon" in the way it meant "whatever is present at any time to the mind in any way".

Concept
According to Peirce: "By the phaneron I mean the collective total of all that is in any way or in any sense present to the mind, quite regardless of whether it corresponds to any real thing or not.  If you ask present when, and to whose mind, I reply that I leave these questions unanswered, never having entertained a doubt that those features of the phaneron that I have found in my mind are present at all times and to all minds.  So far as I have developed this science of phaneroscopy, it is occupied with the formal elements of the phaneron." 

Insights into the nature of the phaneron may be demonstrated in Peirce's argument that the cosmos consists of the complete phaneron and it has indecomposable elements. There is also the case of Peirce's understanding that external reality cannot be considered a phaneron since it is not totally open to observation and that there are always aspects to reality that are known during observation.

In his writings, Peirce characterized phaneron in various ways and these are motivated by four different concerns. The first arises out the thinker's conception of what phenomenology is, which is a study of the possibilities of the consciousness. This underpins one of his characterization of the phaneron as whatever is before the mind or whatever can or could be before the mind. Another concern stems from Peirce's belief that we can only study our own consciousness so aside from the previous characterization, he also referred to phaneron as whatever is before the reader's mind. The third concern pertains the idea regarding what constitutes that which comes before the mind such as the items of consciousness. Finally, Peirce described the phaneron as a totality or the unity of consciousness, maintaining that "the collective total of all that is in any sense present to the mind, quite regardless of whether it corresponds to any real thing or not".

Notes and references

External links
 The Commens Dictionary of Peirce's Terms edited by Mats Bergman and Sami Paavola
 Charles S. Peirce's Phaneroscopy and Phenomenology by Gary Fuhrman

Philosophy of mind
Charles Sanders Peirce